Earl of Yarmouth is a title that has been created three times in British history, once in the Peerage of England and twice in the Peerage of Great Britain. The first creation came in the Peerage of England in 1679 in favour of the politician and scientist Robert Paston, 1st Viscount Yarmouth. He had already been created Baron Paston and Viscount Yarmouth in the Peerage of England in 1673. He was the son of William Paston, who had been created a Baronet, of Oxnead in the County of Norfolk, in the Baronetage of England in 1641. Lord Yarmouth was succeeded by his son, the second Earl. He notably served as Treasurer of the Household between 1687 and 1689. He had no surviving male issue and the titles became extinct on his death in 1732.

The second creation came in the Peerage of Great Britain in 1740 in favour of Amalie von Wallmoden, mistress of George II. She was made Baroness Yarmouth at the same time, also in the Peerage of England. The titles were for life only. Lady Yarmouth was the last Royal mistress to be awarded a peerage. She died in 1765.

The third creation came in the Peerage of Great Britain in 1793 in favour of Francis Seymour-Conway, 1st Earl of Hertford. He was made Marquess of Hertford at the same time. See this article for more information on this creation.

Paston Baronets, of Oxnead (1641)
Sir William Paston, 1st Baronet (c. 1610–1663)
Sir Robert Paston, 2nd Baronet (1631–1683) (created Viscount Yarmouth in 1673 and Earl of Yarmouth in 1679)

Earls of Yarmouth; First creation (1679)
Robert Paston, 1st Earl of Yarmouth (1631–1683) 
William Paston, 2nd Earl of Yarmouth (1654–1732)
Charles Paston, Lord Paston (1673–1718)

Countess of Yarmouth; Second creation (1740)
Amalie Sophie Marianne von Wallmoden, Countess of Yarmouth (1704–1765)

Earls of Yarmouth; Third creation (1793)
see Marquess of Hertford

References

Extinct earldoms in the Peerage of England
Earldoms in the Peerage of Great Britain
Extinct earldoms in the Peerage of Great Britain
1679 establishments in England
Noble titles created in 1679
Noble titles created in 1740
Noble titles created in 1793